Northport may refer to:

Places

United States
Northport, Alabama
Northport, Maine
Northport, Michigan
Northport, Nebraska
Northport, New York
Northport High School
Northport, Washington
Northport, Door County, Wisconsin
Northport, Waupaca County, Wisconsin
Northport Branch, a part of the Long Island railroad system

Other countries
Northport, Malaysia, in Port Klang
Northport, Nova Scotia, Canada
Northport, New Zealand the port for Marsden Point, Northland.

Other uses
NorthPort Batang Pier, Filipino professional basketball team

See also
North Port (disambiguation)